A blood chit is a notice carried by military personnel and addressed to any civilians who may come across an armed-services member – such as a shot-down pilot – in difficulties. As well as identifying the force to which the bearer belongs as friendly, the notice displays a message requesting that the service member be rendered every assistance.

Etymology
Alternative names are escape and identification flags. Chit (also 'chitty') is a British English term for a small document, note or pass, representing a debt to be paid; it is an Anglo-Indian word dating from the late 18th century, derived from the Hindi citthi.

History
The first blood chit may have been made in 1793 when French balloonist Jean-Pierre Blanchard demonstrated his hot air balloon in the United States. Because he could not control the direction of the balloon, no one knew where he would land. Because Blanchard did not speak English, George Washington, according to legend, gave him a letter that said that all U.S. citizens were obliged to assist him to return to Philadelphia.

In World War I, British Royal Flying Corps pilots in India and Mesopotamia carried a "goolie chit" printed in four local languages that promised a reward to anyone who would bring an unharmed British aviator back to British lines. The British officer John Masters recorded in his autobiography that Pathan women in the North-West Frontier Province (1901–1955) of British India (now modern day Pakistan) during the Anglo-Afghan Wars would behead and castrate non Muslim soldiers who were captured, like British and Sikhs.

In the Second Sino-Japanese War prior to World War II, foreign volunteer pilots of Flying Tigers carried notices printed in Chinese that informed the locals that this foreign pilot was fighting for China and they were obliged to help them. A text from one such blood chit translates as follows:

I am an American airman.
My plane is destroyed.
I cannot speak your language.
I am an enemy of the Japanese.
Please give me food
and take me to the nearest Allied military post.
You will be rewarded.

On the UN chit from the Korean war, it is written in Japanese that cooperators will be rewarded and should help for his own 'benefit'.

United States Armed Forces
When the U.S. officially entered World War II in December 1941, flight crew survival kits included blood chits printed in 50 different languages that sported an American flag and promised a reward for a safe return of a pilot. The kit might also include gifts like gold coins, maps or sewing needles. Many U.S. flight crews that flew over Asia had their "blood chit" sewn to the back of their flight jackets. Some units added the blood chit to the crew's flight suits while other units gave the blood chit out only for specific flights. Currently, blood chits are a product of the Joint Personnel Recovery Agency. These recent government-issue items are a small sheet of Tyvek material  with an American flag and a statement in several languages indicating that the U.S. will reward anyone assisting the bearer to safety. They constitute a written promise of the US Government.

While serving in the Global War on Terrorism, some U.S. service members were issued "blood chips" that looked similar to bearer bonds and guaranteed $500,000 for "aid and safe return". They were issued before missions for select ground and convoy personnel, they were placed inside a soldier's ballistic vest OR stitched onto army combat uniform trouser belts prior to missions.

British Armed Forces

Examples of blood chits issued to British RAF personnel in India in the 1940s are printed on thin sheets of silk cloth measuring 20 by 11½ inches (about 50 x 30 cm);  they have the Union flag printed at the top left, and the following text in English and French alongside it:

The main area of the document is printed in three columns with the same text in 15 Asian languages, including Malay, Burmese, Tamil, Thai and Bengali.

Such blood chits or goolie chits were issued to Royal Air Force pilots during the Gulf War. It identifies the bearer as friendly and is issued with gold sovereigns as an incentive.

Americans During the Cold War 
During the Cold War Americans flying reconnaissance over Eastern Bloc countries would be given blood chits in those various languages (e.g. Polish, Czech, and Hungarian) The chits read:

I am an American. I do not speak your language. I need food, shelter and assistance. I will not harm you; I have no malice toward your people. If you help me, my government will reward you.

Norwegian Armed Forces
Norwegian commandos (spesialjegere) had chits—during the War in Afghanistan—"in silk, sewn on the inside of the uniform belt.

Notes

References

External links

 The Flying Tigers blood chit
 Blood Chits of the CBI Theater
 Personnel Recovery in the Department of Defense
 Photo of US Afghanistan Blood Chitct
 

Military personal equipment
Military aviation